In the mathematical field of Riemannian geometry, Toponogov's theorem (named after Victor Andreevich Toponogov) is a triangle comparison theorem.
It is one of a family of comparison theorems that quantify the assertion that a pair of geodesics emanating from a point p spread apart more slowly in a region of high curvature than they would in a region of low curvature.

Let M be an m-dimensional Riemannian manifold with sectional curvature K satisfying 
Let p′q′r′ be a geodesic triangle in the model space Mδ, i.e. the simply connected space of constant curvature δ, such that the lengths of sides p′q′ and p′r′ are equal to that of pq and pr respectively and the angle at p′ is equal to that at p. 
Then

When the sectional curvature is bounded from above, a corollary to the Rauch comparison theorem yields an analogous statement, but with the reverse inequality .

References

External links
 Pambuccian V., Zamfirescu T. "Paolo Pizzetti: The forgotten originator of triangle comparison geometry". Hist Math 38:8 (2011)

Theorems in Riemannian geometry
Geometric inequalities